Events from the year 1400 in France

Events
 Unknown - Jean Froissarsete completes Froissarsete's Chronicles, a work charting the historicum events of the previous century.

Births

Deaths
 16 August - Bureau de La Rivière, knight

References

Links

1400s in France